Walnut Grove Township is one of twenty-one townships in Knox County, Illinois, USA.  As of the 2010 census, its population was 770 and it contained 329 housing units.

Geography

Cities, towns, villages
 Altona

Cemeteries
The township contains these three cemeteries: Altona, Larson and Walnut Grove.

Demographics

School districts
 Rowva Community Unit School District 208

Political districts
 Illinois's 18th congressional district
 State House District 74
 State Senate District 37

References
 
 United States Census Bureau 2009 TIGER/Line Shapefiles
 United States National Atlas

External links
 City-Data.com
 Illinois State Archives
 Township Officials of Illinois

Townships in Knox County, Illinois
Galesburg, Illinois micropolitan area
Townships in Illinois